Ben or Benjamin Ford may refer to:

Ben Ford (politician) (born 1925), British Labour Party Member of Parliament for Bradford North 1964–1983
Ben Ford (restaurateur), American restaurateur, chef and son of actor Harrison Ford
Ben Ford (baseball) (born 1975), American Major League Baseball right-handed pitcher